Tillandsia koehresiana is a species in the genus Tillandsia. This species is endemic to Bolivia.

References

koehresiana
Flora of Bolivia